Amaurobius deelemanae is a species of spider in the family Amaurobiidae, found in Greece, Crete.

References

deelemanae
Spiders of Europe
Spiders described in 1995